Avicularia is a genus of the family Theraphosidae containing various species of arboreal tarantulas. The genus is native to Panama, the Caribbean and tropical South America. Each species in the genus has very distinguishable pink foot pads.

Species belonging to this genus are amongst the relatively small exception of tarantulas that can jump moderate distances as juveniles, with most tarantulas being limited to lunges of 3-4 centimeters.

Urticating hairs are distinct to new world tarantulas including the Avicularia that are attached to the spider's cuticle via a stalk. These spiny, barbed hairs are used as a  defense against potential intruders as well as embedded into silk to protect the egg sac. In active defense, the hairs are released by contact with the stimulus and rubbed in.

At least three species of Avicularia are threatened by habitat loss and illegal trafficking, due to their popularity as exotic pets. Avicularia avicularia are among the tarantulas most commonly kept as pets for their "stunning" color and size.

Taxonomy

The genus Avicularia was erected in 1818 by Jean-Baptiste Lamarck for species previously placed in Mygale Latreille, 1802, the genus name used at the time for most mygalomorph spiders. One of the species Lamarck included in his new genus was Avicularia canceridea, which included Aranea avicularia, first described by Carl Linnaeus in 1758. Araneologists continued to use the name Mygale, although this had been used for genus of mammals in 1800, so was not available for Latreille to use for spiders. Ausserer in 1871 used Avicularia, but a degree of confusion persisted until a decision of the International Commission on Zoological Nomenclature in 1928 established the correctness of Avicularia, with the type species being Linnaeus' Aranea avicularia in the combination Avicularia avicularia.

Linnaeus' name Avicularia is derived from the Latin avicula, meaning "little bird", with the suffix -aria, which is the Latin female singular form of -arius, meaning "pertaining to." This refers to a 1705 illustration by 
Maria Sibylla Merian, showing a tarantula that appears to be of this genus feeding on a bird. The English names "bird spider" and "bird-eating spider," and the German name for tarantula, Vogelspinne (a compound noun literally meaning "bird" [vogel] "spider" [spinne]) reflect this Latin name. Ironically, the term "bird-eater" is more typically applied to the common names of large terrestrial species of tarantulas, such as the Goliath birdeater (Theraphosa blondi), the burgundy Goliath bird eater (Theraphosa stirmi), and the Brazilian salmon pink bird-eating tarantula (Lasiodora parahybana).

A major review of the genus drastically reduced the number of species recognized, from over 50 to 12, . Some species have been transferred to other genera, with others reduced to synonymy. Yet more names are considered to be doubtful in their application (nomina dubia).

Species
, the World Spider Catalog accepted the following species:

Avicularia avicularia (Linnaeus, 1758) (type species) – Venezuela, Guyana, Suriname, French Guiana, Trinidad and Tobago, Brazil, Peru, Bolivia
Avicularia caei Fukushima & Bertani, 2017 – Brazil
Avicularia glauca Simon, 1891 – Panama
Avicularia hirschii Bullmer, Thierer-Lutz & Schmidt, 2006 – Ecuador, Peru, Brazil
Avicularia juruensis Mello-Leitão, 1923 – Colombia, Ecuador, Peru, Brazil
Avicularia lynnae Fukushima & Bertani, 2017 – Peru, Ecuador
Avicularia merianae Fukushima & Bertani, 2017 – Peru
Avicularia minatrix Pocock, 1903 – Venezuela, Brazil
Avicularia purpurea Kirk, 1990 – Colombia, Ecuador, Peru
Avicularia rufa Schiapelli & Gerschman, 1945 – Ecuador, Peru, Bolivia, Brazil
Avicularia taunayi (Mello-Leitão, 1920) – Brazil
Avicularia variegata F. O. Pickard-Cambridge, 1896 – Venezuela, Brazil

Transferred to other genera:

Avicularia affinis (Nicolet, 1849) → Euathlus affinis
Avicularia aymara (Chamberlin, 1916) → Thrixopelma aymara
Avicularia caesia (C.L. Koch, 1842) → Caribena laeta
Avicularia diversipes (C.L. Koch, 1842) → Ybyrapora diversipes
Avicularia dubia → Vitalius dubius
Avicularia duplex → Aphonopelma duplex
Avicularia embrithes → Brachypelma embrithes
Avicularia emilia → Brachypelma emilia
Avicularia epicureana → Brachypelma epicureanum
Avicularia gamba Bertani & Fukushima, 2009 → Ybyrapora gamba
Avicularia geotoma → Aphonopelma geotoma
Avicularia guyana → Eupalaestrus guyanus
Avicularia hageni → Aphonopelma hageni
Avicularia helluo → Aphonopelma helluo
Avicularia hespera → Aphonopelma hesperum
Avicularia hirsuta (Pocock, 1901) → Iridopelma hirsutum
Avicularia imperatrix → Plesiopelma imperatrix
Avicularia laeta (C. L. Koch, 1842) → Caribena laeta
Avicularia lanceolata → Aphonopelma lanceolatum
Avicularia latens → Aphonopelma latens
Avicularia magdalena (Karsch, 1879) → Hapalopus formosus
Avicularia marxi → Aphonopelma marxi
Avicularia mendozae → Grammostola mendozae
Avicularia mesomelas → Megaphobema mesomelas
Avicularia minax (Thorell, 1894) → Grammostola doeringi
Avicularia muritelaria (Holmberg, 1876) → Kukulcani ahibernalis (Hentz, 1842) (Filistatidae)
Avicularia myodes → Plesiopelma myodes
Avicularia obscura → Ami obscura
Avicularia pallida → Aphonopelma pallidum
Avicularia palmicola (Mello-Leitão, 1945) → Iridopelma hirsutum
Avicularia panamensis → Sericopelma panamense
Avicularia parva → Catumiri parvum
Avicularia parvior → Lasiodora parvior
Avicularia pulchra (Mello-Leitão, 1933) and Avicularia recifiensis (Struchen & Brändle, 1996) → Pachistopelma rufonigrum
Avicularia regina (Chamberlin, 1917) → Homoeomma strabo
Avicularia rustica → Aphonopelma rusticum
Avicularia rutilans Ausserer, 1875 → Caribena versicolor
Avicularia sabulosa → Brachypelma sabulosum
Avicularia saltator (Pocock, 1903) → Eupalaestrus weijenberghi
Avicularia seemanni → Aphonopelma seemani
Avicularia seladonia → Typhochlaena seladonia
Avicularia serrata → Aphonopelma serratum
Avicularia smithi → Brachypelma smithi
Avicularia sooretama Bertani & Fukushima, 2009 → Ybyrapora sooretama
Avicularia subvulpina Strand, 1906 → Grammostola subvulpina
Avicularia spinicrus → Citharacanthus spinicrus
Avicularia steindachneri → Aphonopelma steindachneri
Avicularia stoica → Aphonopelma stoicum
Avicularia tamaulipeca → Clavopelma tamaulipeca
Avicularia tripeppi → Nhandu tripepii
Avicularia truncata → Aphonopelma truncatum
Avicularia vagans → Brachypelma vagans
Avicularia vellutina → Vitalius vellutinus
Avicularia versicolor → Caribena versicolor
Avicularia violacea → Tapinauchenius violaceus
Avicularia wacketi → Vitalius wacketi
Avicularia zorodes → Iridopelma zorodes

Treated as synonyms or as nomina dubia:

Avicularia ancylochira Mello-Leitão, 1923, synonym of A. avicularia
Avicularia arabica (Strand, 1908), nom. dub.
Avicularia aurantiaca Bauer, 1996, nom. dub.
Avicularia azuraklaasi Tesmoingt, 1996, nom. dub.
Avicularia bicegoi Mello-Leitão, 1923, synonym of A.  variegata
Avicularia braunshauseni Tesmoingt, 1999, nom. dub.
Avicularia cuminami Mello-Leitão, 1930, synonym of A. avicularia
Avicularia detrita (C. L. Koch, 1842), nom. dub.
Avicularia doleschalli (Ausserer, 1871), nom. dub.
Avicularia exilis Strand, 1907, synonym of A. avicularia
Avicularia fasciculata Strand, 1907, nom. dub.
Avicularia geroldi Tesmoingt, 1999, nom. dub.
Avicularia gracilis (Keyserling, 1891) → Ischnocolus gracilis, nom. dub.
Avicularia hirsuta (Ausserer, 1875), nom. dub.
Avicularia holmbergi Thorell, 1890, nom. dub.
Avicularia huriana Tesmoingt, 1996, nom. dub.
Avicularia leporina (C. L. Koch, 1841) → Iridopelma leporina, nom. dub.
Avicularia metallica Ausserer, 1875, nom. dub.
Avicularia nigrotaeniata Mello-Leitão, 1940, synonym of A. avicularia
Avicularia ochracea (Perty, 1833), nom. dub.
Avicularia plantaris (C. L. Koch, 1842) → Iridopelma plantaris, nom. dub.
Avicularia rapax (Ausserer, 1875), nom. dub.
Avicularia soratae Strand, 1907, nom. dub.
Avicularia surinamensis Strand, 1907, nom. dub.
Avicularia ulrichea Tesmoingt, 1996, nom. dub.
Avicularia urticans Schmidt, 1994, synonym of A. juruensis
Avicularia velutina Simon, 1889, synonym of A. avicularia
Avicularia walckenaeri (Perty, 1833), nom. dub.

References

External links
 Tarantulas of the Genus Avicularia
 Phong's Tarantula page

Theraphosidae
Theraphosidae genera
Spiders of South America
Taxa named by Jean-Baptiste Lamarck